Erapalli Anantharao Srinivas Prasanna  (born 22 May 1940) is a former Indian cricket player. He was a spin bowler, specializing in off spin and a member of the Indian spin quartet. He is an alumnus of National Institute of Engineering, Mysore.

Career

Prasanna played his debut Test cricket match at Madras against England in 1961. His first overseas tour to the West Indies was a tough one and he did not play another Test for five years. He left the sport for a period to finish  his engineering degree, returning in 1967. He gained a regular place in the side following his excellent performances in England in 1967.

He retired in 1978, after a tour of Pakistan which also signalled the decline of Bishen Singh Bedi and Bhagwat Chandrasekhar. He twice led Karnataka to the Ranji Trophy, the first time ending Bombay's 15-year reign. Prasanna was highly successful not only on Indian turning wickets, but on foreign pitches too. He achieved the record of fastest 100 wickets in Tests for an Indian Bowler (in 20 Tests) at his time. His record was broken by Ravichandran Ashwin .

Widely respected and feared in domestic cricket as well, he enjoyed bowling to batsmen that were willing to try  to hit him. He had a neat, brisk, high action and marvellous control of line, length, and flight. He spun the ball in a classic high loop towards the batsman, increasing his chances of beating his adversary in the air. As a result, he made the ball bounce higher than expected. A bowler with an attacking mindset, he was also patient, and would bait a batsman for over after over, attempting to induce a mistake.

He has written an autobiography, One More Over.

Awards and achievements
 1970 – Padma Shri Award
 2006 – Castrol Lifetime Achievement award.
 2012 – Award from Board of Control for Cricket in India for playing more than 50 Test matches.
 3rd Cross Road in Dommaluru, Bengaluru has been respectfully named as EAS Prasanna Road

References

External links
 

1940 births
Living people
India Test cricketers
Karnataka cricketers
South Zone cricketers
Indian Universities cricketers
Recipients of the Padma Shri in sports
Cricketers from Bangalore
Recipients of the Arjuna Award